Franco Gualdrini (26 June 1923 – 21 March 2010) was an Italian bishop in the Catholic Church.

A native of Faenza, he was appointed bishop of the Diocese of Terni-Narni-Amelia on 14 September 1983, a position he held until his retirement on 22 March 2000.

Gualdrini died in 2010, at the age of 86.

See also

References

External links
Catholic Hierarchy: Bishop Franco Gualdrini †

1923 births
2010 deaths
People from Faenza
Bishops in Umbria